William J. Gaston (September 19, 1778 – January 23, 1844) was a jurist and United States Representative from North Carolina. Gaston is the author of the official state song of North Carolina, "The Old North State". Gaston County, North Carolina, created just after his death, was named for him, as later were the city of Gastonia, North Carolina, artificial Lake Gaston, and the Gaston Hall auditorium at his alma mater, Georgetown University.

Early life
Gaston was born in New Bern, North Carolina, on September 19, 1778.  He was the son of Dr. Alexander Gaston and  Margaret Sharpe.

He entered the Catholic Georgetown Academy in Washington, D.C., at the age of thirteen, becoming its first student. Due to illness shortly thereafter, he also became its first dropout. After Georgetown and some education in North Carolina, he graduated from the College of New Jersey (today Princeton University) in 1796, where he studied law.

Career
Gaston was admitted to the bar in 1798 and commenced practice in New Bern. He was a member of the North Carolina General Assembly in 1800, served in the State House of Commons (now known as the House of Representatives) from 1807 to 1809, and as its Speaker in 1808. He was a member of the North Carolina State Senate in 1812. He was elected to the U.S. House of Representatives, on the Federalist ticket, serving from March 4, 1813, to March 3, 1817 (the 13th and 14th U.S. Congresses). While in Congress, he obtained a federal charter for Georgetown College (today Georgetown University). In 1814, Gaston was elected a member of the American Antiquarian Society. In 1817, he was elected a member of the American Philosophical Society.

Gaston did not run for Congress in 1816, returning to serve in the North Carolina Senate in 1818–1819. He again served in the U.S. House of Representatives in 1824, 1827, 1828, 1829, and 1831.

In 1832, Gaston delivered the annual graduation address at the University of North Carolina. Although he owned slaves, his speech included what was the last public statement in North Carolina urging the abolition of slavery:

Gaston was appointed to the North Carolina Supreme Court in 1833; as a legislator in 1818, he had introduced the bill that established the Court as a distinct body. He held the position until his death. He wrote a decision that limited the control that slave-owners could exercise over enslaved humans. Gaston was offered but declined a nomination for election to the United States Senate in 1840, and he turned down an offer to be U.S. Attorney General under President Harrison.

Gaston won elective office on several occasions, even though the Constitution of North Carolina before 1835 seemed to prohibit it, because Gaston was a Roman Catholic. The young Rev. Andrew Byrne, later bishop of the Diocese of Little Rock, having contracted a serious illness during the course of his lengthy missionary labors, recuperated under the hospitable roof of Judge Gaston.
Gaston was largely responsible, as a member of the Constitutional Convention of 1835, for removing official discrimination against Catholics from North Carolina law.

Personal life

Gaston was married three times. His first marriage was on September 4, 1803, to Susan Hay (d. 1804). He married for the second time on October 6, 1805, to Hannah McClure (d. 1813). Together, William and his second wife were the parents of one son and two daughters:
 Alexander Gaston (1807-1848), who married Eliza W. Jones and then Sarah Lauretta Murphy.
 Susan Jane Gaston (1808-1866), who married Robert Donaldson Jr.
 Hannah Margaret Gaston (1811-1835), who married Matthias E. Manly.

His third and final marriage was on September 3, 1816, to Eliza Ann Worthington (d. 1819). With his third wife, Gaston was the father of two additional daughters:
 Elizabeth Gaston (1817-1874), who married George W. Graham.
 Catherine Jane Gaston (1819-1885), who did not marry.

He died in his office in Raleigh, North Carolina, on January 23, 1844.  He was interred in Cedar Grove Cemetery, New Bern, N.C.  His home at New Bern, the Coor-Gaston House, was listed on the National Register of Historic Places in 1972. Elmwood, his home at Raleigh, North Carolina, was listed in 1975.

See also
 Thirteenth United States Congress
 Fourteenth United States Congress

References

External links
  
 William Gaston Papers, Southern Historical Collection, Louis Round Wilson Special Collections Library, University of North Carolina at Chapel Hill.
 Entry in the Dictionary of North Carolina Biography, William S. Powell, University of North Carolina Press.

1778 births
1844 deaths
Princeton University alumni
Georgetown University alumni
Members of the North Carolina House of Representatives
North Carolina state senators
Justices of the North Carolina Supreme Court
Politicians from New Bern, North Carolina
Federalist Party members of the United States House of Representatives from North Carolina
Members of the American Antiquarian Society
18th-century American politicians
19th-century American politicians
19th-century American judges
Catholics from North Carolina
American abolitionists